Tony Gregory (1947–2009) was an Irish independent politician.

Tony or Anthony Gregory may refer to:
 Anthony Gregory (born 1981), American anarcho-libertarian
 Anthony Karl Gregory (born 1966), Icelandic football striker
 Tony Gregory (footballer) (1937–2021), English football player and coach

See also
 Grégory Tony (born 1978), French kickboxer and boxer